is a station on the Tama Toshi Monorail Line in Hino, Tokyo, Japan.

Lines
Kōshū-Kaidō Station is a station on the Tama Toshi Monorail Line and is located 8.0 kilometers from the terminus of the line at Kamikitadai Station.

Station layout
Kōshū-Kaidō Station is a raised station with two tracks and two opposed side platforms, with the station building located underneath. It is a standardized station building for this monorail line.

Platforms

History
The station opened on 10 January 2000.

Station numbering was introduced in February 2018 with Kōshū-Kaidō being assigned TT09.

Surrounding area
The station is in the middle of a residential area, running above Tokyo Metropolitan Route 503.

References

External links

 Tama Monorail Kōshū-Kaidō Station 

Railway stations in Japan opened in 2000
Railway stations in Tokyo
Tama Toshi Monorail
Hino, Tokyo